Kevin Sylvester may refer to:
 Kevin Sylvester (Canadian broadcaster)
 Kevin Sylvester (American broadcaster)